Trier is a city in Germany on the banks of the Moselle.

Trier may also refer to:

Uses
 Trier (region), a historical region of Germany
 Trier Air Base, a former military airfield near Trier, Germany
 Trier of fact, in a legal proceeding

People
 Allonzo Trier (born 1996), American basketball player
 Carola Trier (1913–2000), German pilates practitioner
 Hann Trier (1915–1999), German artist
 Herman Trier (1845–1925), Danish educator and politician
 Joachim Trier (born 1974), Norwegian film director 
 Jost Trier (1894–1970), German linguist
 Karl von Trier (1265–1324), Grand Master of the Teutonic Order
 Lars von Trier (born 1956) (Lars Trier), Danish film director
 Walter Trier (1890–1951), Czech-German illustrator

See also
 
 
 New Trier (disambiguation)
 Trier-Land, a collective municipality in the Trier-Saarburg district, Germany
 Trier-Saarburg, a district in Germany